Reginald Ballard (born October 13, 1965) is an American character actor and comedian from Galveston, Texas, who is best known for his recurring roles as Bruh-Man in the sitcom Martin and W.B. on The Bernie Mac Show, which both aired on Fox. After graduation from Ball High School, where he was an all district linebacker, Ballard earned a full football scholarship to Southern Methodist University, where he was also a theatre major. Just before his senior year, Ballard transferred to the University of Missouri, where he continued to play football, while continuing to act, appearing in a university production of A Soldier's Story in the role of C.J. Memphis.

Career
Spurning overtures from pro-football, Ballard headed to Hollywood to pursue his acting career. He has appeared in many different television shows, such as Veronica Mars (the episode "Return of the Kane"), The Parkers, Sister, Sister, Just Jordan, the short-lived show, Crumbs, and Raven's Home.  He co-starred in the independent film Big Ain't Bad as Butch.  Currently, Ballard is performing stand-up comedy. He is also a former all-district linebacker for Ball High School. He was a speedy linebacker for the Tors, helping Ball High to a 7–3 record his senior season in 1983. He also helped lead the best defense in District 24-5A that year, a defense that allowed only 60.9 yards per game. After playing football at SMU Mustangs for his first three college years, Ballard transferred to Missouri for his senior year after the SMU football program was hit for NCAA violations. He said the acting bug bit him after taking a theater class in college, "getting lost in a scene", and listening to the audience applaud. He was also featured in Big Sean’s music video for "Play No Games" as his own character "Bruh Man" mouthing Ty Dolla $ign's part in the song. He will lend to voice a Security from the upcoming streaming service at Monsters at Work on Disney+.

Personal life
Ballard is married with two children, and the family resides in Pasadena, California.

Filmography

Film/Movie

Television

External links

References

1965 births
Living people
Male actors from Texas
African-American male actors
African-American male comedians
American male comedians
21st-century American comedians
American male television actors
People from Galveston, Texas
Southern Methodist University alumni
University of Missouri alumni
21st-century African-American people
20th-century African-American people